The climate of Uttar Pradesh (U.P.) is primarily defined as humid subtropical with dry winter (Cwa) type with parts of Western U.P. as hot semi-arid (BSh) type. Alternatively, some authors refer to it as tropical monsoon. Variations do exist in different parts of the large state, however the uniformity of the vast Indo-Gangetic Plain forming bulk of the state gives a predominantly single climatic pattern to the state with minor regional variations. 
U.P. has a climate of extremes.

Seasons of Uttar Pradesh
Indian Meteorological Department (IMD) breakdowns the climate of India into the following seasons: 
 Winter Season / Cold Weather Season (January and February)
 Summer season/ Pre-monsoon season/ Hot weather season/ Thunderstorm season (March, April, May and June)
 South-west Monsoon/ Summer Monsoon (July, August and September)
 Post-monsoon or Northeast monsoon or Retreating SW Monsoon season (October, November and December)
This classification is primarily Monsoon centric given the vast effect that it casts on the lives and agriculture of India.

Classification of the Uttar Pradesh climate
The climate of Uttar Pradesh is generally defined to be tropical monsoon type. However based on the Köppen climate classification, it can be classified mostly as Humid Subtropical with dry winter (CWa) type with parts of Western U.P. as Semi-Arid (BS) type (refer to map of India above)

Based on IMD classification, UP has the following three predominant seasons:
 Winter Season – November to February
 Summer season – March, April and May
 South-west Monsoon – June, July, August, September and October
Retreating Monsoon season, although existent, has a very negligible effect in Uttar Pradesh and only occasional mild showers are experienced in winter. Some of these showers are not even due to the Monsoon but due to western disturbances.

The primary temperature, rainfall and wind features of the three Distinct Seasons of U.P. can be summarised as below:
Fall in temperature on rainy days.

Given significant climatic differences, U.P. has been divided into two meteorological sub-divisions – U.P. East and U.P. West.

Geographical terrain
The state of Uttar Pradesh is in the heart of Indo-Gangetic Plain with River Ganges flowing right through it, Himalayas to the north of it and the Chota Nagpur Plateau and the Vindhyas to the south of it.

Temperature
High temperatures of around  have been recorded in Gonda district of U.P.
Given such a wide range of temperature fluctuations in most parts of the state, it can lead to either cold waves or heat waves both resulting in substantial loss of life and economy.

Heat waves
In 2007, Banda with  temperature was the leader in terms of hot districts of U.P. for several days. At least 62, people were reportedly dead during the heat wave that year.

Cold waves
End of 2010 and starting of 2011 was no different with winters bringing news of cold-wave related deaths. In the month of January in Lucknow temperature can plunge to 0℃ mark, like when Lucknow recorded  on 18 January 2017. Agra and Muzaffarnagar are also notorious for chilly winds and temperature can plunge to sub zero mark.

Precipitation
It rains over most of U.P. with very few arid or semi-arid patches. Snowfall doesn't occur but hail-storms, frost and dew occur often in U.P. The type of rainfall that U.P. receives is orographic, cyclonic and convectional.

Rain
Primarily a summer phenomenon, the Bay of Bengal branch of the Indian Monsoon is the major bearer of rain in most parts of U.P. It is the South-West Monsoon which brings most of the rain here, although rain due to the western disturbances and North-East Monsoon also contribute small quantities towards the overall precipitation of the state.
The rain in U.P. can vary from an annual average of 170 cm in hilly areas to 84 cm in Western U.P. Given the concentration of most of this rainfall in the 4 months of Monsoon period, excess rain can lead to floods and shortage to droughts. As such these two phenomenons of floods and droughts are a common recurrence in the state.

Floods in U.P.
Floods are a known hazard of U.P. due to overflowing of its main rivers like Ganga, Yamuna, Ramganga, Gomti, Sharda, Ghaghra, Rapti and Gandak. Major flood management efforts have been undertaken to mitigate the risk. Most of these floods occur due to the Monsoon rains and overflowing of rivers during the rainy periods. Year 2010 witnessed one such year of flooding in U.P.

Droughts in Uttar Pradesh
Shortage of rain during the highly variable Monsoon season can cause droughts in U.P. leading to severe loss to man and property.
The recurrence of a major deficiency in annual rainfall follows a 6–8 years cycle in Eastern U.P. whereas in Western U.P., it is a 10 years cycle.

Wind
In summers, hot winds called loo blow all across U.P. They are dust-laden and quite damaging. In winters, dry and rainless winds blow across the state. Fog may also form in parts of U.P.

Climate data

See also

Geography of Uttar Pradesh (section of Climate)
Uttar Pradesh (Section of climate)
Climate

References

Geography of Uttar Pradesh
Uttar Pradesh
Uttar Pradesh